Oil of clove, also known as clove oil, is an essential oil extracted from the clove plant, Syzygium aromaticum. Clove oil is commonly used in aromatherapy and for flavoring food and some medicines. Madagascar and Indonesia are the main producers of clove oil.

Some countries, such as the UK, acknowledge its use for temporary relief of toothache, although there is insufficient medical evidence to support its use as an analgesic.

Types and phytochemicals
There are three types of clove oil:
 Bud oil is derived from the flower-buds of S. aromaticum. It consists of 60–90% eugenol, eugenol acetate, caryophyllene and other minor constituents.
 Leaf oil is derived from the leaves of S. aromaticum. It consists of 70–82% eugenol, and some amounts of beta Caryophyllene and alpha Humulene.
 Stem oil is derived from the twigs of S. aromaticum. It consists of 85–92% eugenol, with other minor constituents. Stem oil is closer in olfactive and flavor profile to bud oil. 

Distilled clove oil from buds contains mixed phytochemicals, including as main constituents phenylpropanoids (primarily eugenol), carvacrol, thymol, and cinnamaldehyde, with smaller quantities of polyphenols, carbohydrates, lipids, oleanolic acid, and rhamnetin.

Human health

Toxicity 
Clove oil is toxic in anything other than small therapeutic doses, and several cases of acute liver and kidney damage have been reported, principally in children.

Toothache 
Particularly in South Korea and India, eugenol, a phytochemical extracted from clove oil, is used to relieve toothache. Applied to a cavity in a decayed tooth or tooth socket remaining after extraction, eugenol or clove oil may relieve toothache temporarily. In the United States, the FDA considers eugenol ineffective for treating dental pain, and has downgraded clove oil as an analgesic due to insufficient evidence to rate its effectiveness.

Other uses 

Eugenol is a reliable source for producing natural vanillin (by the US definition). It is a versatile molecule, which can be converted to vanillin with a few simple steps of conversion through the use of naturally available phytochemicals.

Clove oil is commonly used to anesthetize or euthanize laboratory or pet fish.

Clove oil is a component of choji oil, which was traditionally used for the maintenance of Japanese swords.

Regulation
In Germany, Commission E permits the sale and administration of clove oil as a medicinal herb.

References

Cloves
Dental materials